HMS Royalist was a Bellona-class (improved )  light cruiser of the Royal Navy (RN) during the Second World War.

After commissioning in 1943, Royalist was modified with extra facilities and crew for operating as a flagship for aircraft carrier operations. Initially it operated in the North Sea before transferring to the Mediterranean for the invasion of southern France. Royalist remained in the Mediterranean for actions against German forces in the  Aegean to the end of 1944. Then it moved to the Far East in February 1945 where it served until the end of the war. 

The Royalist was then put into reserve until 1953, when the RN decided to proceed with plans to refit the ship for a new intended operational role as a fast radar picket. The cost of reconstruction and reactivation of the ship led the RN to transfer the vessel to the Royal New Zealand Navy (RNZN) in 1956 as a replacement for its sister ship HMS Bellona, which had been in New Zealand service since 1947. In return, New Zealand covered the reconstruction costs of the Royalist. After ten years service with the RNZN, which included involvement in the Suez Crisis in 1956 and the Indonesia–Malaysia confrontation from 1963 to 1965, the ship returned to the United Kingdom where it was scrapped.

Development 
The Royal Navy (RN) intended in late 1943 to use the Bellona class as flagships for escort carrier and cruiser groups for the projected invasion of Normandy and of southern France and for operations with the United States Navy and with the RN fleet in the Pacific. Royalist quickly diverged from the rest of the class from the start being fitted out - within months of commissioning - with further modifications. These modifications gave it two extra rooms for additional communications with aircraft carriers and Fleet Air Arm aircraft and one of the first implementations of an "Action Information Office" (AIO) – an early operations room for plotting and display of the tactical position and associated mechanical computers to make it more effective. The wartime development of radar and the requirement to equip Royalist as a "Carrier Flagship" fitted with AIO increased the crew complement from 484 to 600, adding to the problem.

Royalist was built by Scotts Shipbuilding and Engineering Company of Greenock laying down the keel on 21 March 1940. She was launched on 30 May 1942 and commissioned on 10 September 1943. She returned to the dockyard for alterations in November which were not complete until February 1944. Her French motto, Surtout Loyal, translates to "Loyal above all".

Royal Navy career

Following her commissioning, Royalist spent several months working up, during which time she underwent repairs for trial defects and for alterations and additions. These included modifications for service as a carrier flagship.  In March 1944 Royalist joined the Home Fleet and served for a short period in the Arctic theatre. In this capacity she took part in Operation Tungsten, the carrier raid in April 1944 against the German battleship Tirpitz at anchor in a fjord in Norway, as the flagship of Rear Admiral Arthur La Touche Bisset commanding Force Two (based around five carriers).

After Tungsten Royalist escorted carriers for attacks on shipping off Norway before entering dock for a refit. After completion of the work in June, Royalist was ordered to the Mediterranean to support the Operation Dragoon landings in the south of France in August 1944. Royalist was the flagship (Rear Admiral Thomas Hope Troubridge) of the RN/USN Task Force 88 (comprising carrier groups TG88.1  and  TG88.2) that was to maintain air superiority over the beaches and support the landing operations.

After Dragoon, Royalist joined the Aegean Force preventing enemy evacuation from the islands in the Aegean Sea. On 15 September, accompanied by the destroyer , she sank the transports KT4 and KT26 off Cape Spatha. She was then stationed in the Aegean until late 1944, when she was then in the eastern Mediterranean  before a refit in early 1945 at Alexandria before transferring to the East Indies and joining the Eastern Fleet.

By April 1945 she was with the 21st Aircraft Carrier Squadron as flagship, supporting the Rangoon landings of Operation Dracula.

From 10 May Royalist was covering a search group of carriers in Operation Mitre looking for Japanese warships carrying out evacuations in the area of Nicobar and Andaman Islands. For the remainder of the war she covered the carrier raids against targets in the East Indies and Sumatra.

Scottish author Alistair MacLean served on Royalist during the Second World War, and used his experiences as background for his acclaimed first novel HMS Ulysses (1955) as well as for some of his subsequent works.

Post war reconstruction

Royalist was withdrawn from the East Indies after the conclusion of hostilities, and returned home to be mothballed and dehumidified in 1946.

The modernisation of four Dido-class cruisers including Royalist was approved by the Admiralty board on 30 March 1950 and 6 April 1950.  Royalist was planned to be the first of 4-6 Dido- and Bellona-class cruisers to be modernised under the programme, with work planned to begin in January 1953. The decision to prioritise the updating of Royalist and the Didos were for the same reasons the RNZN accepted HMS Black Prince and Bellona as replacements for Gambia in 1946; the Didos were modern, more economical in fuel and manpower, and could be modernised on a realistic timescale and budget by fitting Type 275 radar directors with British adaptions of the US Mk 37 fire control for effective medium range anti-aircraft cover. Previous post war plans to refit the Colony-class and Swiftsure-class cruisers were abandoned in 1950 on cost and time grounds The Dido class had the same 5.25 guns as the King George V battleships and HMS Vanguard as PM Winston Churchill wanted to maintain the battleships in the 1950s.  The Dido cruisers and HMS Royalist was essentially the same size as 50 cruiser-destroyers the RN planned as cruiser replacements in 1949-50.

The reconstruction of Royalist from deep preservation with new superstructure and advanced interim fire control fitted involved major work but was intended to extend the cruiser's life by only six years. Diadem was better preserved and was offered to the RNZN as an alternative in 1955.   Royalist and Diadem were complex warships even as built in 1944. After refit and rewiring in 1956 they could never be further updated and to be kept running needed 200 men aboard even for short periods in reserve and refit; difficult for small navies such as the RNZN.

In March 1953 the reconstruction of Royalist was started  The works included new superstructure and electronics, but retained the old engines.  The reconstruction of the Dido-class cruisers was intended to upgrade them for only six years more service to 1962 the period of maximum danger and threat from the USSR. However when  Churchill, led the Conservative Party back into office, in the second of two 1951 general elections 1951 United Kingdom General Election, to the surprise of the Royal Navy, if not the RAF and Army supporting Tory constituency, Churchill strongly  favoured the RAF and the 1952 Navy Estimates (budget) was reduced. The massive Korean War defence budget expansion by the Attlee government which allowed the Dido/ Town reconstruction programme to be fully designed was  unaffordable by 1952 and the Type 275 Mk 6 radar (which could have allowed immediate fitting of the in-service cruisers HMS Phoebe, Diadem, Cleopatra and Euryalus to give long range AA capability to the 5.25 DP guns), was unavailable in a UK/RN model until 1955  and there was only enough unused stock of earlier equivalent sets (supplied under lend lease in 1944-45) to fit the carriers HMS Eagle and Ark Royal.

The delays in equipment made completion of the Tiger class by 1954 impossible and an alternative plan to reconstruct the larger Town-class light cruisers, HMS Liverpool and HMS Glasgow with STAAG 2 anti-aircraft guns, Type 960M Air Warning radar, Mk 6 275 Flyplane fire control presumambly for the Mk19 twin 4 inch and lattice masts and AIO was cancelled in 1952.

The RAF had priority and the Royal Navy view of development centred on frigates and large carriers - was not liked by Churchill. The cruiser reconstruction program was suspended for three years. With the immediate and changing priorities of the Korean War and the great difficulty and expense of developing compact steam propulsion with adequate range and speed and good close-in defence for the destroyers and frigates. The radical defence review in June 1953 saw heavy cuts to the navy but Royalists modernisation continued under a revised defence White paper in February 1954 which restored the RN programme and plans to complete the aircraft carrier Hermes and the s, but rejected starting further Dido/Bellona conversions as they lacked the "dual war and peace, cold war capabilities required for the RN".  The other Didos –  HMS Sirius and Phoebe – scheduled in the 1952 program to start reconstruction in April 1954, after 12 years in the water, were inspected in 1954 and declared for scrap, due to inadequate mothballing. Plans were made in 1952 for a more comprehensive modernisation of Cleopatra and Diadem starting in June and November 1955 with reboilering, full NBC protection, and new radar (992TA and (2)982 Air Warning)  but reconstruction by 1955 at 5-6 million pounds per cruiser was twice that of a Battle class AD conversion capable of carrying out some cruiser presence, patrol and GFS roles. The cramped living conditions of a 4 turret Dido conversion were intolerable for a post war peacetime navy. 
The radical reviews of the RN in 1953 and 1954 concluded that the risk of a third world war had lessened. The immediate provision of interim AA cruiser conversions and the upgrade of the Type 41, Type 61 and Type 12 frigates then under construction with 3-inch automatic guns and L70, 40mm instead of 4.5-inch guns was cancelled in Feb 1955. To reduce the cost of the ambitious Korean conflict rearmament programme approved in 1950 and  reallocate the approved 25, 3/70 AA turrets to the Tiger gun cruisers approved in Nov 1954 and scheduled large 18,000 ton missile cruisers.   The T41 design was upgraded in 1954 with extra communications UHF, HF channels, generator capacity and the addition of LRAW 960/965 to the Type 41 in Feb 1954  to play the radar picket role intended for Royalist with Commonwealth aircraft carriers and amphibious groups, meant the Type 41 no longer had the space and weight to take the massive 3/7O twin mounts. The new Type 275 Mk 6 flyplane fire control systems would be refitted to eight Ca-class destroyers instead of the Didos in 1955-59. With 3 openbacked, Mk 5 single 4.5 turrets in the small Ca it was somehow envisaged the small destroyers, preserved in the form of HMS Cavalier could somehow play a cruiser role, escorting convoys and task forces, destroying enemy trade and attacking enemy heavy units in torpedo and gun attacks as part of RN destroyer and cruiser groups. The unrealism of the role announced for the Ca destroyers nearly saw the 2nd Ca flotilla reconstruction cancelled in 1954-5. Although it is clear the RN saw their real role in the North Sea and SE Asia.  The Royal Navy planned on the incorrect basis that guns would be ineffective for AA from 1963, as air targets were assumed to have increased speed from Mach 0.9 to Mach 2. It was decided by Feb 1955, Mk 5 low 55 degree elevation 4.5 guns, would be adequate and accurate for GFS and sufficient surface cover  for the new Type 81 GP frigates and updated Ca destroyers.  A reduction in the naval budget with more standardisation of classes and gun calibre was essential and the 4.7 and 5.25 gun equipped classes of battleships, cruisers and destroyer were transferred to reserve, sold or scrapped. 

Five year life extension refits for  Colony-class cruisers Bermuda and Gambia, were completed at half the cost,  of a Bellona reconstruction, as was approved reconstruction of destroyers as AD/AW picket role was planned in 1955, using the 1943 Battle class completed in 1948. Life extension of the Town class cruisers, HMS Sheffield and HMS Belfast, in reserve for eight years, from 1959 and 1963 respectively, was arguably, not a good return, on expensive refits. HMS Swiftsure largely reconstructed in 1/1956-6/1959,  but never recomissioned, a complete waste. The older more spacious Town-class with more compartments were wanted for these roles and the Colony cruisers and Swiftsures the same age or newer than the Dido's and Bellona's were not quite  as uncomfortable in the Far East. 

An updated 5.25 cruiser was a possible solution and deterrent to the new Soviet threat, which could not be countered a frigate with a single 4.5-inch turret.

Transfer to Royal New Zealand Navy 
The New Zealand Prime Minister Sid Holland decided to accept the offer of Royalist in Feb 1955. By then the cruisers reconstruction was only half completed , 3 million pounds having been expended by the UK Treasury  New Zealand ultimately paid £4.5 million for the reconstruction. In early 1955 Holland reached the decision after a seven-week visit to the US and UK where he met the American vice president Richard Nixon, secretary of state John Foster Dulles, and Churchill who somewhat dimished in his final days as PM. stressed, that a modernised  cruiser rebuilt for limited war, East of Suez was more value than modern frigates, for escort duties against submarines in broken back war, In Churchills view a nuclear war was likely to a brief exchange of the new thermonuclear weapons, unlikely to last long enough for WW3 anti submarine convoys to be useful. Holland was more influenced by the advice of the British Minister of Defence Harold Macmillan, to refocus NZ defence on the Pacific and shorter lines of communication to South East Asia rather than Middle East. The British First Sea Lord and Admiralty minister stressed the availability of 'Royalist' and that an order of two or three anti-submarine frigates would probably proceed, the Type 12 frigate was untested and unproven, and the RN viewed it was desirable to wait for new types of frigates suitable for NZ conditions with more gunpower and anti-submarine capability.

The cost of Royalists reconstruction reached £4.5 million. (the same as the cost of two new 2,500-ton frigates). A minority of RNZN opinion, including Captain Peter Phipps, saw it as a policy reversal stopping the RNZN maintaining six frigates, good training conditions and commonality with new RN frigates. However Royalist, with massive assistance from the RN and US Navy, was operational, post refit, for nine and half year. After Suez in 1956 the Royal Navy transferred the bulk of the fleet to the Indian and Pacific oceans from 1957 to 1967. As a result, Royalist could be deployed  with the RN carrier fleet.

The ship was handed over to the Royal New Zealand Navy on 9 July 1956. When Captain Phipps went to take command of Royalist in 1955, New Zealand diplomat Frank Corner showed his own view, when he noted that Phipps agreed that the ship was a white elephant, unsuitable for use in the Pacific. However The RNZN had operated the Bellona and Black Prince (the same class as Royalist) since 1946 as part of NZ Defence contribution in 1946–54. Phipps claimed the cruiser's range was limited and it could not even reach Panama without refuelling. However Phipps also stated when the cruiser reached Auckland, that it was updated, as a most modern warship, with the capability to take "three targets simultaneously, and shoot down air targets with reasonable frequency often on the first salvo"

The Type 12 (Whitby-class) anti-submarine frigates proved in use to have only 2/3rds of the projected endurance of 4000 nm at 15 knots. By comparison the longer-range diesel version Type 41 Leopard-class anti-aircraft frigates, with two twin 4.5 turrets, would have countered the problem of unreliability with single turret of the Otago-class. The Type 41 (and Type 61  Salisbury-class aircraft direction frigate) original radar and fire control fit was similar to Royalist and the Type 12  except the frigates had AC electrics.

The New Zealand Navy Board, of which three members were RN officers, argued the RN view that the RNZN needed a cruiser in the South Pacific and to support the RAN/RN. The point of Royalist from the RN viewpoint was a powerful interim late 1950s medium range AA platform with 30 rpm on two channels from four twin 5.25-inch guns. The space and comfort problems were only minimally altered by any economy in the AIO suite or 40 mm light AA and reducing to three main turrets destroyed the cruiser's primary AA value. 
The cruiser was a RN cruiser on loan, and not renamed "HMNZS New Zealand". The UK did not regard the RNZN as an independent force compared to the RAN and RCN. Phipps finally accepted the cruiser three weeks later after the minimum of adjustments; four showers added; the officers' baths removed and minor ventilation improvements.

The Royal Navy saw Phipps' action as a disruption of the Suez naval preparations by a colonial upstart and an action unfitting of a serious RN senior officer and gentleman. Post-Suez the RNZN view of Phipps, the RNZN, its officers, and men, was unchanged. New Zealand was viewed as having zero capability for strategic assessment and the RN requested confirmation from the New Zealand  government that in 1957 the RN East Asian staff would have authority of Royalist.

Royalist lacked the pre-wetting, ABC spraydown equipment, specifically requested by the RNZN in 1955. In 1957, Royalist like the other Dido-class cruisers had beds only for 47 officers, in a standard cabin; the ratings had only a hammock. Royalist lacked even the single extra room with a sofa for senior rates on other Dido cruisers but did offer speed and extra communications systems and an Action Information Office (AIO) fitted late 1943. The other Dido-class cruiser fitted with AIO, HMS Scylla, was also seen as valuable post war. Scylla had detonated a mine on 23 June 1944 off Arromanches. It was deemed uneconomic to return her to wartime service. But reconstruction at Chatham began in 1945 with a new fit of two twin Mk 6 3-inch/70 mounts and Type 992 radar approved. In 1947, after £350,000 of work, defence cuts and delays, the cruiser was written off. AIO-fitted cruisers (usually late Colony class and Minotaur class) doubled the effectiveness of armament in RN postwar assessment,.

The concern of New Zealand naval servicemen and Phipps was on living conditions, recruitment, ammunition resupply in the Pacific and an affordable schedule of new frigates. The New Zealand Department of External Affairs viewed the British Treasury as getting rid of an odd cruiser and getting New Zealand to pay for the warships refit. However, as with Bellona and Black Prince in 1946, transferring Royalist was supplementing Australian defence. By 1955 the RAN had only light 4.5-inch gun, Battle-class and  destroyers (building) and light carriers, HMAS Melbourne and Sydney, with obsolete Sea Venom fighters. Royalist could join an RAN task force with Melbourne and Sydney and the cruisers   shells, offered  AA and some deterrence to Sverdlov cruisers.  Royalist, had modern two-channel fire control for its guns and radar processing and communications with the RN/ RAN Fleet air arms. The Australian Prime Minister Robert Menzies was dubious that RN policy in the age of nuclear deterrence, was  "minor fleet to the Far East in peacetime only" and no real counter to piecemeal communist erosion in Southeast Asia. The UK defence review released on 10 July 1953, argued that new hydrogen bombs reduced the likelihood of 'long'  broken-backed war requiring trans-Atlantic convoys and maintaining cruisers. The RN could not afford new AA gun models to supplement expensive  missile developments like the Seaslug missile. Mountbatten  publicly defended Royalist as the most modern British cruiser in Auckland when it arrived in December 1956 and regarded Phipps as inexperienced and unsuitable. Mountbatten viewed New Zealand's cabinet and officials as out of touch with the Cold War need to maintain ready, broad-based naval and defence capabilities and frequently visited New Zealand to make appeals. 

STAAG was a maintenance nightmare withdrawn from the RN in 1959–60. The 5.25-inch DP guns, which were also  fitted to Vanguard and at Gibraltar were accurate unlike the 4-inch AA on the Colony class. Royalists modernisation for AA/AW and particularly air defence support of RN carrier fighters and strike aircraft would prove useful for Suez, the Malaysian Emergency and the confrontation with Indonesia.

It was arguable that the traditional cruiser role in trade defence against Soviet cruisers and raiders was relevant, as was contributing effective AW/AD to RN/ RAN carrier task forces.

After refitting, Royalist was re-equipped with new equipment as an AA and AD picket for carriers. The cruiser retained  5.25-inch guns, upgraded to RP20 as more powerful high level AA and surface weapons. The refit was to prepare it for all-out hot wars and high-level gun engagement of shadowers. Except for Royalist, this modernisation was cancelled in 1953 on cost grounds. Defence review and RAF assessments that the Sverdlov and Russian air threat in the 1955–58 period was exaggerated. The RAF estimated 300 Badger jet bombers in 1956 - the actual number was 500. The delay in the cruiser programme meant most war legacy cruisers had reached 12 years in service, doubling the cost of structural modernisation and reducing the programme. Only Royalists update and a ten-year life extension of HMS Ceylon was approved in 1953.

In transferring Royalist to New Zealand, the Royal Navy assumed the RNZN as an extension of the RN and the junior New Zealand service and government followed British command. Around 25% of the officers on Royalist were RN officers on loan or exchange, as were many of the specialist ratings. The RNZN officers on the cruiser were usually of junior experience and had lengthy training with the RN in the UK. Even on the cruiser's final deployment in 1965 on Confrontation patrols in southeast Asia, many RN and RAN officers occupied higher-ranking officer positions on board.

Royal New Zealand Navy career

Suez 
After working up in UK waters, Royalist was operational with the British fleet in the Mediterranean. From August 1956, NZ Prime Minister Sidney Holland was persuaded by Anthony Eden to maintain Royalist on station in the Mediterranean as an invaluable, 'strategic deployment' and 'deterrent' against Egyptian or Israeli aggression; Eden assured Holland that it was purely precautionary move. At the same time Eden and the RN continued the dual strategy while both negotiating with Egypt and preparing with war, and attempting to lock Royalist into the strategy through persuasion by the First Sea Lord (and Chief of Naval Staff) Lord Mountbatten and the First Lord of the Admiralty, Lord Hailsham.UK PM Eden and the C-C of the Med fleet clearly felt Royalist AA & AD capability was superior to the other ageing and deficient RN cruisers available in the Med and provided, alternative threat scenarios of possible Israeli air threats to the RN fleet  ,and used other delaying tactics, they were, always, about to officially release. Royalist to steam back to NZ. The NZ Cabinet largely supported the British invasion, future PM Marshall and the MOD MacDonald alone dissented. To order, Royalist to simply withdraw and immediately return to Auckland was, too damaging to the RNZN and the  crews mana and morale and future NZ trade with Britain. The NZ Cabinet accepted, a intermediate proposal of allowing Royalist to remain with the fleet, but to not participate in the 'action'. Given the Royalist, primary surveillance and communication role, what defined, action or inaction, was unclear. The classic dilemma of NZ military 'softpower'. Holland actually anticipated that Musketeer would last a while and situations would unfold leading to a clear public request from the UK for direct use of the cruisers, weapons in the action. 'more royalist than the king'. So the Royalist remained with the fleet awaiting the possibility of action against Egyptian air force during the Suez crisis. Royalist was intended to be mainly a picket and rescue ship offering aircraft direction for RAF English Electric Canberra bombers and RN carrier-based Hawker Sea Hawk and de Havilland Sea Venom aircraft. Royalist had the same long-range air warning Type 960/277Q radar carried by British cruisers in the area, but superior AA gunnery and aircraft direction to the other cruisers and destroyers.

After hostilities with Egypt commenced,  Commonwealth support for the mission was confined to New Zealand and Australia, South Africa viewing it as an issue to be avoided and Canada as irrelevant to own interest  and requiring international peacekeeping, the international opposition, and the possibility of being held responsible, alongside Britain and France put Prime Minister Holland, who like Menzies  in Australia had a Cabinet of old fashioned British patriots, in the position of wanting both to "stand by the UK" despite their misgivings while not damaging New Zealand's relationship with the US. President Eisenhower  viewing the British and French invasion as embarrassing as it coincided with a election in the USA in which he sought reelection as President and the USSR was engaged  in invading and reasserting control in its own colonial empire ,reoccupying Budapest. Holland appeared to suffer a mild heart attack on the day of the invasion. But on hearing the  Anglo French action had begun, remained in his parliamentary office for 48 hours  supervising New Zealand's response and the drafting of orders, cables and to the UK Government, Foreign Office and Royalist, after heated exchanges with NZ Foreign Service officers, RNZN and NZDF staff,and his Cabinet on instructions to Cpt Phipps to withdraw the RN/RNZN joint manned, cruiser Royalist. Hollands health and National government (like Anthony Eden, UK Government) never recovered from the Suez crisis and dissention, within his own staff   . The previous afternoon photo-reconnaissance flights had identified 63 MiG fighters and 49 Ilyushin Il-28 "Beagle" bombers there. The night RAF bomber strikes from Malta and Cyprus had failed to destroy any of the Egyptian aircraft on 31 November. Royalist remained on station for possibly 24 hours as AD picket and rescue ship, sometimes assisting the RN fighter bombers to navigate to targets and return to their carriers until  transferred from shore bombardment duty off Port Said and the risk from Egypt's jet fighters and bombers was suppressed. A day later,  Royalist withdrew from a scheduled bombardment mission in support of a RN destroyer squadron, moving further offshore away from the main body of the RN fleet (and changing identity to the RNZN "Black Swan" according to some accounts) but continuing to assist the in its primary air warning and communications role. 
Holland had officially ordered a withdrawal from operations but allowed the cruiser to stay with the Operation Musketeer fleet.  In a lengthy meeting the NZ cabinet had "decided not to decide" and while NZ did not want to embarrass Britain by withdrawing Royalist "there was insufficient time for a decision not to withdraw". Much of the Czechoslovakia-supplied Ilyushin-IL28 and MiG 15/17 of the Egyptian Air Force remained a threat to the RN fleet and Royalist was crucial to fleet defence. The reality of the pro-Musketeer sentiments of the RNZN/RN crew in which most of the key officer and senior rating positions were RN officers and many of the RNZN officers were also essentially professional RN career officers on the return voyage to New Zealand via South Africa. Captain Phipps told the crew they deserved the recognition given to RN personnel for their involvement in the incident. In the 2000s the New Zealand Labour Government and the RNZN awarded these personnel battle honours for war service in the Mediterranean. The cruiser's log for the crucial days of the Suez War was destroyed at the time meaning the full account of her Suez service will never be known.

Malaya 

In early 1957 Royalist was involved in exercises with the Australian aircraft carrier HMAS Melbourne. The cruiser made two shore bombardment missions in 1957–1958 during the Malayan Emergency against suspected terrorist areas in south east Johore, firing about 240 5.25-inch rounds. In AA exercises with the British Far East Fleet in 1956–57, Royalist outperformed the (pre-war) RN s, shooting down five Gloster Meteor unmanned targets and many towed targets immediately on opening fire.

In 1960 Royalist had a major five-month refit. It was expected the cruiser would only serve another two and a half years; the New Zealand navy board was seeking loan of a third Whitby-class frigate (Type 12) from the Royal Navy However the RN was only just introducing and trialling the improved  (Type 12M) frigates and was short of effective frigates and cruisers. In February 1964 after  was lost after it collided with the aircraft carrier Melbourne, the UK offered Australia the Daring-class destroyers,  (available immediately) and  then in mid-life refit with new MRS3 fire control.Defender was available to replace Royalist from February 1965.

In 1962  Royalist suffered permanent damage in rough weather in the Tasman Sea with the keel twisted out of alignment. The RAN captain, determined to make Auckland for a Rugby Union test between the Wallabies and All Blacks at Eden Park, had been running the ship at excess speed into a head sea. The back of the cruiser was technically broken and it could have been assessed as a 'constructive loss' and, as uneconomic to repair, scrapped. It would never be possible again for the cruiser's gun directors to determine the cruisers datum centreline necessary for accurate targeting.

The cruiser operated with the British Far East Fleet, in three tours of duty in 1963, 1964 and 1965, during the Indonesia–Malaysia confrontation the crews being belatedly awarded General Service Medals for the 1963–64 tours and Operational Service Medals for active service in combat zones in 1956, 1957–1958 and 1965, finally recognised by the New Zealand government in 2000. The ship's modernisation had provided only for a lifespan of six years, so these conditions were expected. Effective modernisation of the ship after acquisition from the Royal Navy only amounted to several ECM/ESM updates.

By May 1964 the Indonesian Confrontation had escalated with Indonesian forces conducting cross-border raids in Kalimantan and landings in Borneo. The British Minister of Defence Peter Thorneycroft and Mountbatten requested the use of carriers and major units to conduct provocative passages,  to encourage a revolt against Sukarno and his generals. After rest and recreation in Singapore, Royalist took on 580 tons of fuel oil on 14 July 1964 and the following morning took ammunition on from lighters. It left Singapore in the afternoon returning to Auckland from Singapore via the Cairns races in Queensland, transited the Carmat Straits on 15 July, Sapud on 16 July (at ABC state Yankee, at 2130 raised to condition X Ray at 2230) as it was in the Java Sea between Jakarta and southwest Kalimantan and then ran along the coast of Java thru the night to arrive off Bail at sunrise about 6.00 am and through the Lombok Strait on 17 July 1964 on what was described as "routine passage" in the highly confidential communication to Canberra.

The two transits of the straits made the task group led by the aircraft carrier  , a month apart that followed were both also described as routine passage only the second was even notified with a note from the RN naval attaché at the British embassy to the Indonesian Navy, which was a concession the track would be through Lombok not Djakarta and the major Indonesian military bases. During the transit of the straits, the guns were fully manned with the crews closed up; if the cruiser had been "buzzed" by Indonesia aircraft or patrol craft, the captain was instructed to take "precautionary measures" and not train or elevate the guns or test fire them again during the deployment, a "diplomatic artifact" given a scenario of undetectable possible threat of surprise long-range air-launched Kh-20 (NATO reporting name "Kangaroo") cruise missile attack from Indonesia bombers and full ABC protection at X Ray state 9

Victoriouss assertion of the right of innocent passage by a carrier caused mass panic in Java, but proved effective in establishing rights for naval passage and that Indonesia's assertion was unlikely to be outright war to stop Malaysian independence.

There was considerable doubt among RNZN staff whether Royalist, which had not had a major refit since 1956, could deploy again in 1965. It managed to deploy again after a seven-week refit working round the clock in Devonport dockyard and work up in the Hauraki Gulf, where it managed  at half power. The cruiser was still visually impressive, and provided the appearance of capability and ability to operate. It was judged that the fire control systems needed either a year's refit or $140,000 of new parts, one of the two STAAG CIWS mounts was refitted with a worn spare, and the two UA3 ESM systems were playing up. It was hoped the worn steam turbines could last 15 months to allow a final 1966 visit to all the New Zealand ports if "hope prevailed over fear".

Against most RNZN staff advice it was decided not to inform the Commander of the British Far East Fleet, of the situation as "Commander Far East has enough trouble fitting Royalist in his operational plans now with limitations on his main capability in the Confrontation War." The Royal Navy was desperately overstretched during the confrontation, and keeping one carrier fully operational in the theatre at all times was difficult to provide nuclear deterrence to Jakarta with the threat of potential aerial nuclear strike. HMS Royalist was still perceived by the RN as useful and needed in Singapore, even if it could not run at the 25+ knots needed when a carrier group was launching aircraft as an escort for amphibious carriers like HMS Albion and HMS Bulwark and it was decided Royalist would proceed to Pearl Harbor for a second workup, rather than a longer refit in the Devonport dockyard, before deploying to Hong Kong and Singapore in support of RN forces.

During Royalist stay at Pearl Harbor the USN Staff and naval dockyard provided substantial assistance in alleviating some of the cruiser's faults and adjustments to allow the fire control system to be aligned for brief periods. During the subsequent workup Royalist achieved "E Excellent" for Efficiency, meaning maximum efficiency within system capability though, like all peacetime naval or weapon tests, actual effectiveness was not measured. During a brief spell on station at Singapore in 1965, Royalist conducted anti-infiltration patrols, boarding boats, deployed shore patrols, and participated in Exercise Guardrail as the simulated "enemy Sverdlov cruiser" and provided extra men, potential heavy gunfire support, and AD support for Bulwark on a vulnerable deployment transferring a new helicopter squadron to Borneo. For the 1965 Far East tour, the crew were awarded Operational Service Medals. This reflects the general build up in tension with Indonesia, the probable use of weapons by landing parties, the higher grade of main munition preparation and the political support for the mission, but the earlier deployments of Royalist when its system were more effective were much more important in the tactical and even strategic sense.

The 1965 deployment was somewhat marred by the refusal by the New Zealand Ministry of External Affairs and British ambassadors to allow Royalist to dock with RN ships at Tokyo or Yokohama. According to the Royal Navy attaché in Tokyo, the RNZN sailors "could not afford the one pound per minute price in the Ginza nightclubs and bars." The captain of Royalist, J.P. Vallant replied to the Deputy Secretary of Defence in Wellington, "..find it quaint that ... the New Zealand navy is persona non grata in the Tokyo Bay area." Royalist was confined to Japanese provincial ports with New Zealand diplomats persuading the local police chiefs against a curfew and to keep bars open 24 hours. After further shore leave in Bangkok, Singapore, and Subic Bay, Royalist returned to New Zealand, after a valiant repair of a milking boiler and turbine en route. It was unable to make its final scheduled 1966 visit for Waitangi Day (6 February) and tour of the New Zealand ports, and was effectively paid off five months early.

Decommissioning and fate
Royalist was paid off on 4 June 1966 and, after eleven years in the RNZN, Royalist reverted to Royal Navy control in 1967. She was sold for scrap to the Nissho Co, Japan, in November 1967 and was towed from Auckland to Osaka on 31 December 1967.

Notes

Citations

Bibliography

External links
 

 

Dido-class cruisers
Ships built on the River Clyde
1942 ships
World War II cruisers of the United Kingdom
Dido-class cruisers of the Royal New Zealand Navy